Lisandro Pedro Varela Semedo (born 12 March 1996) is a professional footballer who plays as a winger for Radomiak Radom. Born in Portugal, he represents the Cape Verde national team.

Club career
On 15 July 2016, Semedo signed for Reading from Sporting CP, on a three-year contract. A year later, Semedo moved to AEZ Zakakiou.

Loan to OFI
On 27 June 2019, he joined OFI on a season-long loan from Fortuna Sittard. On 29 September 2019, he scored his first goal for the club in a 3–1 home win against Asteras Tripolis. On 6 October 2019, Semedo made an outstanding performance, in a triumphant 4–1 home win against Panionios, netting a brace and giving one assist. On 26 October 2019, he sealed a 2–0 home win against Xanthi. On 3 November 2019, Semedo scored soon after kick-off, but his team eventually suffered a 3–2 away defeat against AEL, despite taking a two-goal advantage.
On 30 November 2019, Semedo scored the only goal after 52 minutes and taking on a pass from Juan Neira, sealing a vital 1–0 home win game against AEK Athens.

On 1 March 2020, he scored, after four months, in a 3–0 home win against Lamia.

Radomiak
On 9 July 2022, he joined Polish Ekstraklasa side Radomiak Radom on a two-year contract.

Personal life
Semedo is of Cape Verdean descent.

Career statistics

Club

References

External links

1996 births
Living people
Sportspeople from Setúbal
Citizens of Cape Verde through descent
Cape Verdean footballers
Cape Verde international footballers
Portuguese footballers
Portuguese sportspeople of Cape Verdean descent
Cape Verdean expatriate footballers
Portuguese expatriate footballers
Association football forwards
Sporting CP footballers
Reading F.C. players
AEZ Zakakiou players
Fortuna Sittard players
OFI Crete F.C. players
Radomiak Radom players
Eerste Divisie players
Cypriot First Division players
Super League Greece players
Ekstraklasa players
Expatriate footballers in England
Expatriate footballers in the Netherlands
Expatriate footballers in Cyprus
Expatriate footballers in Greece
Expatriate footballers in Poland
Cape Verdean expatriate sportspeople in England
Cape Verdean expatriate sportspeople in Cyprus
Cape Verdean expatriate sportspeople in the Netherlands
Cape Verdean expatriate sportspeople in Greece
Cape Verdean expatriate sportspeople in Poland
2021 Africa Cup of Nations players